Sophie Charlotte Wolf da Silva (born 29 April 1989) is a German-Brazilian actress.

Early life 
Sophie was born in Hamburg, Germany. She is the daughter of a German mother and a Brazilian father, born in the state of Pará. She left her parents' house in Niterói to live in Rio de Janeiro with her friend actress Carolinie Figueiredo, with whom she shared an apartment.

Career 
In the telenovela Caras & Bocas by Walcyr Carrasco she played Vanessa. She played the role of an antagonist in the telenovela Ti Ti Ti. She played Maria Amália, who is the daughter of the protagonist and the sister of her then real life boyfriend Malvino Salvador in the 2011 telenovela Fina Estampa. She's also acted in As Brasileiras (2012); portrayed the protagonist Amora in Sangue Bom (2013), Ritinha in Doce de Mãe (2014), Duda in O Rebu (2014) and Alice in Babilônia (2015).

Personal life
In May 2014 she began dating Daniel Oliveira. They married on December 6, 2015 in Niterói. She gave birth to their first son, Otto, on March 14, 2016.

Filmography

Television

Film

Theater

Awards 
Sophie Charlotte was nominated for the 11th Contigo Award in category "Best Female Newcomer Award" for her work as Angelina in Malhação.

References

External links 

 

1989 births
Living people
Actresses from Hamburg
German people of Brazilian descent
Brazilian people of German descent
Brazilian telenovela actresses
Brazilian stage actresses
Actresses from Rio de Janeiro (city)